Hitterdal is a city in Clay County, Minnesota, United States. The population was 199 at the 2020 census.

History
A post office called Hitterdal has been in operation since 1887. The city was named after Hitterdal, in Norway.

Geography

Demographics

2010 census
As of the census of 2010, there were 201 people, 89 households, and 58 families living in the city. The racial makeup of the city was 96.5% White, 1.5% African American, 0.5% Asian, and 1.5% from two or more races. Hispanic or Latino of any race were 1.0% of the population.

There were 89 households, of which 27.0% had children under the age of 18 living with them, 56.2% were married couples living together, 5.6% had a female householder with no husband present, 3.4% had a male householder with no wife present, and 34.8% were non-families. 30.3% of all households were made up of individuals, and 14.6% had someone living alone who was 65 years of age or older. The average household size was 2.26 and the average family size was 2.81.

The median age in the city was 44.5 years. 21.9% of residents were under the age of 18; 9.1% were between the ages of 18 and 24; 20% were from 25 to 44; 27.5% were from 45 to 64; and 21.9% were 65 years of age or older. The gender makeup of the city was 55.7% male and 44.3% female.

2000 census
As of the census of 2000, there were 201 people, 86 households, and 57 families living in the city. The racial makeup of the city was 97.01% White, 1.49% Asian, 1.00% from other races, and 0.50% from two or more races. Hispanic or Latino of any race were 1.49% of the population.

There were 86 households, out of which 29.1% had children under the age of 18 living with them, 55.8% were married couples living together, 3.5% had a female householder with no husband present, and 33.7% were non-families. 30.2% of all households were made up of individuals, and 17.4% had someone living alone who was 65 years of age or older.  The average household size was 2.34 and the average family size was 2.89.

In the city, the population was spread out, with 25.4% under the age of 18, 8.5% from 18 to 24, 21.9% from 25 to 44, 26.4% from 45 to 64, and 17.9% who were 65 years of age or older.  The median age was 42 years. For every 100 females, there were 118.5 males.  For every 100 females age 18 and over, there were 105.5 males.

The median income for a household in the city was $32,500, and the median income for a family was $35,625. Males had a median income of $33,125 versus $19,375 for females. The per capita income for the city was $13,737.  About 17.2% of families and 12.3% of the population were below the poverty line, including 18.8% of those under the age of eighteen and none of those 65 or over.

Government
The current mayor is Gayle Holte.

References

Cities in Minnesota
Cities in Clay County, Minnesota